Chilsworthy is the name of two villages in south west England. One is on the Cornish side of the River Tamar, just upstream from Gunnislake  The other is about 3 km north west of Holsworthy in Devon  in the civil parish of Holsworthy Hamlets; it is home to a late-19th century Methodist chapel.

Villages in Devon
Villages in Cornwall